Monroe County School District is a name shared by several school districts in the United States.
 Monroe County School District (Alabama)
 Monroe County School District (Florida) 
 Monroe County School District (Georgia)
 Monroe County School District (Kentucky) (see List of school districts in Kentucky)
 Monroe County School District (Mississippi)